The World Figure Skating Championships is an annual figure skating competition sanctioned by the International Skating Union in which figure skaters compete for the title of World Champion.

The 1947 competitions for men, ladies, and pair skating took place from February 13 to 17 in Stockholm, Sweden. These were the first World Figure Skating Championships after World War II. Skaters from Germany, Austria, and Japan were not allowed to compete.

Results

Men

Judges:
 J. Bizek 
 P Sörensen 
 Hubert M. Martineau 
 A. Winkler 
 Lyman Wakefield

Ladies

Judges:
 C. F. MacGillicuddy 
 Donald Cruikshank 
 J. Hainz 
 Walter Jakobsson 
 Herbert J. Clarke 
 B. Börjeson 
 P. Sörensen 
 Thore Mothander 
 Lyman Wakefield

Pairs

Judges:
 M. Nicaise 
 J. Hainz 
 Georges Torchon 
 Hubert M. Martineau 
 Christen Christensen 
 Einar Törsleff 
 Lyman Wakefield

Sources
 Result List provided by the ISU

World Figure Skating Championships
World Figure Skating Championships
World Figure Skating Championships
International figure skating competitions hosted by Sweden
February 1947 sports events in Europe
1947 in Swedish sport
International sports competitions in Stockholm
1940s in Stockholm